Roldán is a small city in the , located within the metropolitan area of Greater Rosario. According to the 2001 census, it had a population of 11,470 inhabitants. Its area is 114 km².

It was founded in 1870, and officially became a city in 1987.

From 2001 to 2021, the Mayor of Roldán was José María Pedretti, the current Mayor is Daniel Escalante
.

References 

 

Populated places in Santa Fe Province